List of heads of government in Ivano-Frankivsk Oblast and Stanislawow Voivodeship provides a summary of people who were in charge of the regional government in the lands of the former Stanislawow Voivodeship and the today's Ivano-Frankivsk Oblast.

Voivodes (Second Polish Republic)
Edmund Jurystowski: 21 October 1921 – 18 August 1925
Aleksander Des Loges: 18 August 1925 – 25 October 1926
:pl:Władysław Korsak: 18 December 1926 – 12 September 1927
:pl:Aleksander Morawski: 28 October 1927 – 30 October 1928
:pl:Bronisław Nakoniecznikow-Klukowski: 30 October 1928 – 29 August 1930
:pl:Zygmunt Jagodziński: 3 September 1930 – 1 February 1936 (acting till 2 February 1931)
:pl:Mieczysław Starzyński: 11 February 1936 – 22 June 1936 (acting )
Jan Sawicki: 23 June 1936 – July 1936
:pl:Stefan Pasławski: 14 July 1936 – 20 January 1939
:pl:Stanisław Jarecki: 20 January 1939 – 2 September 1939

Regional government (Ukrainian SSR)

Chairmen of Executive Committee

First secretary of the Party

Regional government (Ukraine)

Chief of Regional State Administration

Chairman of council

Regional leaders of the Soviet State Security services

External links
  Description of the administrative development of the region
  Справочник по истории Коммунистической партии и Советского Союза 1898–1991

Governors
Voivodes of Poland
History of Ivano-Frankivsk Oblast